William Barrett Heisten (born March 19, 1980) is an American former professional ice hockey forward who played in the National Hockey League (NHL).

Playing career
Heisten played high school hockey at Dimond High School in Anchorage.

He played college hockey at the University of Maine. He was drafted by the Buffalo Sabres in the first round with 20th overall pick in the 1999 NHL Entry Draft. Having not been signed by the Sabres, the New York Rangers signed him as a free agent in 2001. He played just ten games with the Rangers before being traded to the Dallas Stars along with Manny Malhotra for Martin Ručínský and Roman Lyashenko. He spent the next two years playing for the Stars' AHL team, the Utah Grizzlies. He was not re-signed, and in 2004 signed a one-year deal with New York Islanders, although he never played for them due to the lockout. In 2005, he was contemplating retirement when his brother Chris asked him to play alongside him in the ECHL for their hometown team, the Alaska Aces. He signed with the Aces and helped them win the Kelly Cup, the ECHL's championship trophy.

Heisten re-signed with the Aces heading into the 2006–07 ECHL season, and was named an alternate captain. He initially declared his retirement during the summer following that season, but decided to come back in hope of an injury-free season. He was named captain by coach Keith McCambridge. Although his statistics were not nearly as  outstanding as they had been earlier in his career, he contributed valuable leadership to the team. His healthier season, however, was not to be. He suffered a concussion in a game on December 11 in which the Aces hosted the Stockton Thunder. He returned to action during a December 19 game at Victoria, but was removed after symptoms resulting from the concussion surfaced again. After missing 15 consecutive games, Barrett announced retirement on January 18, in consideration of his long-term health.

Career statistics

Regular season and playoffs

International

Awards and honors

External links

1980 births
Living people
Alaska Aces (ECHL) players
American men's ice hockey left wingers
Bridgeport Sound Tigers players
Buffalo Sabres draft picks
Hartford Wolf Pack players
Ice hockey people from Anchorage, Alaska
Maine Black Bears men's ice hockey players
National Hockey League first-round draft picks
New York Rangers players
Seattle Thunderbirds players
USA Hockey National Team Development Program players
Utah Grizzlies (AHL) players
NCAA men's ice hockey national champions